Robert Gibbon Johnson (July 23, 1771 – October 2, 1850), also known as Colonel Johnson, was an American gentleman farmer, historian, horticulturalist, judge, soldier and statesman who lived in Salem, New Jersey. He is especially renowned for the apocryphal story that he publicly ate a basket of tomatoes at the Old Salem County Courthouse in 1820 to demonstrate that they were not poisonous, as was supposedly commonly thought at the time. He was a keen antiquarian and wrote a history of Salem – An Historical Account of the First Settlement of Salem, in West Jersey – which was published by Orrin Rogers in 1839.

Early life and education
Johnson was the only child of his parents Robert Johnson and Jane Gibbon. He was born on 23 July 1771 at the home of his great-uncle, John Pledger – a large plantation in Mannington Township, New Jersey called the New Netherland Farm. He was visiting the farm in March 1778 when the British raided Salem during the Revolutionary War and killed several of the inhabitants. The British commandeered Pledger's house and Johnson was imprisoned with the family for several days. Still a young boy, he later led his mother away to safety.

His early education was in Pittsgrove where he was taught Presbyterianism by Reverend William Schenck. He was subsequently educated at Newark Academy in Delaware and Princeton from where he graduated in 1790. He had planned to practise law but instead concentrated upon agriculture for most of his life, managing the large family estate.

Domestic life
He married Hannah Carney on 19 June 1798. They had four children but the first two daughters died in infancy. Their third daughter, Anne Gibbon Johnson, survived and married a Philadelphia lawyer, Ferdinand Hubbell. Their fourth and last child, Robert Carney Johnson, married Julia Harrison and went on to inherit the family estate in Salem.

Johnson and his mother had moved into Salem town when his father had died. They had stayed in the house of his great-grandfather, Alexander Grant, which still stands today in Market Street. After marrying, he built a new house for the family in 1806–7 – Johnson Hall, also in Market Street. This was the first house built in Salem in the Federal style but has some idiosyncratic asymmetries, apparently for functional reasons. It is brick-built with two stories, five bays, a high roof with a balustrade and fine interior woodwork. Johnson wanted this house to remain in the family but it was sold to the county in 1922 and relocated when a new courthouse was built on the plot. But it still stands today nearby and houses the Chamber of Commerce, Visitors' Center and similar offices.

Johnson's first wife, Hannah, died at about the age of thirty, while her son Robert was still a child. In 1813, Johnson then married Juliana Zantzinger who was about 32 years old. Juliana lived until 1854 but they had no further children.

Around 1826, there was a falling out with a domestic black slave, Amy "Hetty" Reckless, who escaped to Philadelphia and sought the protection of abolitionists, claiming that she had been promised her freedom by Johnson's mother and that Juliana had mistreated her by pulling out her hair and knocking out two teeth with a broomstick. Colonel Johnson petitioned for her return but the suit was unsuccessful and Reckless did not return to Salem until he had died.

Military service and public offices
In 1794, he served in the New Jersey brigade under General Bloomfield, as paymaster of its second regiment, and saw action in Pennsylvania putting down tax rebels – the Whiskey Rebellion. In 1796, he was commissioned as a cavalry captain by Governor Howell and, in 1798, he was promoted to the rank of major. Subsequent governors promoted him to lieutenant-colonel in 1809 and full colonel in 1817. He was a keen equestrian and rode in a bold, erect style into his seventies.

In 1796, he was appointed a commissioner of the loan office for the county – a New Jersey institution founded to provide mortgages to local farmers to help their cash flow. In 1825, he was a member of the New Jersey Legislature and he served more than one term. In 1833, he was appointed as a county court judge and served for several terms. He also served as the trustee for a Delaware college and Princeton Theological Seminary. He attended the Episcopal Church in Salem but, in 1820–21, he established the First Presbyterian Church in Salem and became its first elder in 1823.

He was a keen local historian and, in 1839, his An Historical Account of the First Settlement of Salem, in West Jersey was published. He maintained a collection of important local historical documents and was instrumental in establishing a public library in Salem. He was a founder member of the New Jersey Historical Society and was its first vice-president from its founding in 1845. In 1846, he presented a paper on John Fenwick, Chief Proprietor of Salem Tenth to the society in Elizabethtown.

Farming
Johnson was an active horticulturalist and was a president of the New Jersey Horticultural Society, and wrote about draining marshland in The American Farmer in 1826. Johnson's later reputation credited him with introducing the tomato into the area around 1820. Tomatoes became a significant crop in southern New Jersey, which was able to ship its fresh, ripe produce to the local large markets of New York and Philadelphia. However, even though much contemporary material relating to Johnson survives, the first written claim associating him with the introduction of the tomato to Salem dates only to the early 20th century. The apocryphal story accompanying this posthumous reputation was popularized by Joseph Sickler, the Salem postmaster, who told Harry Emerson Wildes an anecdote about Johnson publicly eating tomatoes to prove their safety on account of the plant being in the nightshade family. Wildes published the story in his book The Delaware in 1940 and Stewart Holbrook then dramatized the event in his 1946 book, Lost Men of American History, adding dialogue to the tale. With Sickler as a consultant, the CBS radio show You Are There then broadcast a re-enactment of the event in 1949. The legend of Johnson's daring deed then became well-established in numerous works and retold in further dramatic accounts:For a period in the 1980s, Salem celebrated "Robert Gibbon Johnson Day" by re-enacting the dramatic event with live actors in costume. In 1988, Good Morning America reported that Colonel Johnson was the first to eat a tomato in the United States, but there are hundreds such stories about other individuals – Thomas Jefferson, a Shaker bride, immigrant Italians (e.g., Michele Felice Cornè), and many others – despite the fact that the tomato was long recognized as edible throughout Europe and Central and South America.

References

Citations

Further reading

1771 births
1850 deaths
19th-century American lawyers
American slave owners
Farmers from New Jersey
Members of the New Jersey Legislature
New Jersey lawyers
People from Mannington Township, New Jersey
People of New Jersey in the American Revolution
People from Salem, New Jersey
Princeton University alumni